Brđani is a village in Požega-Slavonia County, Croatia. The village is administered as a part of the City of Pleternica.

According to national census of 2011, population of the village is 49.

Sources

Populated places in Požega-Slavonia County